Saro is a municipality located in the autonomous community of Cantabria, Spain.

Localities
 Llerana.
 Saro (Capital).

References

Municipalities in Cantabria